In Greek mythology, Canace (Ancient Greek: Κανάκη means "‘barking") was a Thessalian princess as daughter of King Aeolus of Aeolia and Enarete, daughter of Deimachus. She was sometimes referred to as Aeolis.

Family 
Canace was the sister of Athamas, Cretheus, Deioneus, Magnes, Perieres, Salmoneus, Sisyphus, Alcyone, Calyce, Peisidice, Perimede Arne and possibly Tanagra. As the lover of Poseidon, she was the mother of Aloeus, Epopeus, Hopleus, Nireus and Triopas.

Mythology 
In another, more famous version Canace was a lover not of Poseidon, but of her own brother Macareus. This tradition made them children of a different Aeolus, the lord of the winds (or the Tyrrhenian king), and his wife Amphithea. Canace fell in love with Macareus and committed incest with him, which resulted in her getting pregnant. Macareus promised to marry Canace but never did. When their child was born, Canace's nurse tried to take the baby out of the palace in a basket, pretending to be carrying a sacrificial offering, but the baby cried out and revealed itself. Aeolus was outraged and compelled Canace to commit suicide as punishment, sending her a sword with which she was to stab herself. He also exposed the newborn child to its death. This story was told by Latin poet Ovid in the Heroides, a selection of eighteen story-poems that pretend to be letters from mythological women to their lovers and ex-lovers. The story is also briefly referred to by Hyginus and retold by Pseudo-Plutarch, in whose account Macareus kills himself over the matter as well. It was also the subject of Euripides' lost play Aeolus, on which the extant versions appear to be based. 

Canace's story was also put to the stage in the verse tragedy Canace (1588), by Italian playwright Sperone Speroni, as well as being the subject of a tale in Gower's Confessio Amantis. She also gave her name to the heroine of Geoffrey Chaucer's Squire's Tale.

In ancient art
According to Pliny the Elder (35.99), a certain Aristeides from Thebes painted Canace dying from love to her brother. This image, not preserved, might be dated between 340 and 290 BCE.
Macareus' and Canace's story is found on a hydria from Lucania, now in the archeological museum of Bari. It is thought to illustrate some scenes from Euripides' lost tragedy Aeolus.
There is also a fresco from Rome, making part of a series of women personnages (the others being Pasiphaë, Phaedra etc.). Canace is depicted with a sword in her hand. The series might be a copy of some Hellenistic painting.

Notes

Princesses in Greek mythology
Aeolides

References 

 Apollodorus, The Library with an English Translation by Sir James George Frazer, F.B.A., F.R.S. in 2 Volumes, Cambridge, MA, Harvard University Press; London, William Heinemann Ltd. 1921. ISBN 0-674-99135-4. Online version at the Perseus Digital Library. Greek text available from the same website.
Callimachus, Hymns translated by Alexander William Mair (1875-1928). London: William Heinemann; New York: G.P. Putnam's Sons. 1921. Online version at the Topos Text Project.
 Callimachus, Works. A.W. Mair. London: William Heinemann; New York: G.P. Putnam's Sons. 1921. Greek text available at the Perseus Digital Library.
 Hesiod, Catalogue of Women from Homeric Hymns, Epic Cycle, Homerica translated by Evelyn-White, H G. Loeb Classical Library Volume 57. London: William Heinemann, 1914. Online version at theio.com 
 Hyginus, Fabulae from The Myths of Hyginus translated and edited by Mary Grant. University of Kansas Publications in Humanistic Studies. Online version at the Topos Text Project.
 Pausanias, Description of Greece with an English Translation by W.H.S. Jones, Litt.D., and H.A. Ormerod, M.A., in 4 Volumes. Cambridge, MA, Harvard University Press; London, William Heinemann Ltd. 1918. . Online version at the Perseus Digital Library
Pausanias, Graeciae Descriptio. 3 vols. Leipzig, Teubner. 1903.  Greek text available at the Perseus Digital Library.
Plutarch, Moralia with an English Translation by Frank Cole Babbitt. Cambridge, MA. Harvard University Press. London. William Heinemann Ltd. 1936. Online version at the Perseus Digital Library. Greek text available from the same website.
 Publius Ovidius Naso, The Epistles of Ovid. London. J. Nunn, Great-Queen-Street; R. Priestly, 143, High-Holborn; R. Lea, Greek-Street, Soho; and J. Rodwell, New-Bond-Street. 1813. Online version at the Perseus Digital Library.

Thessalian characters in Greek mythology
Thessalian mythology
Suicides in Greek mythology
Incest in Greek mythology